Josef Rumler (20 July 1922 in Chlumec nad Cidlinou – 1 November 1999 in Prague) was a Czech poet, literary critic, historian, editor and translator from Polish language and to Esperanto.

Garners 
 Vynášení houslí (1970)
 Hrnek ranního mléka (1973)
 Výstup na horu Říp (1978)

Czech poets
Czech male poets
1922 births
1999 deaths
Czech Esperantists
20th-century Czech poets
20th-century male writers
Czech translators
People from Chlumec nad Cidlinou
20th-century translators
Polish–Esperanto translators
Translators from Esperanto
Translators to Esperanto
Translators from Czech
Translators to Czech
Czechoslovak writers